The comb-crested jacana (Irediparra gallinacea), also known as the lotusbird or lilytrotter, is the only species of jacana in the genus Irediparra.  Like other jacana species, it is adapted to the floating vegetation of tropical freshwater wetlands.

Description

This species is unmistakable. It has a black crown and hindneck with a fleshy red wattle covering the forehead and forecrown, contrasting with a white face and throat. The comb is pinker in breeding adults, more orange when not breeding. There is a broad black band on the lower breast with white belly. The underwing and flight feathers, which show most prominently in flight, are black. Back and upperwing mainly grey-brown with black primary coverts, rump and tail. The long legs with extremely long toes trail in flight. The male is slightly smaller than the female and measures  in length and weighs . The female measures  in length and weighs .

Distribution and habitat
The bird occurs in south-eastern Borneo, the southern Philippines, Sulawesi, Moluccas, Lesser Sunda Islands, north and south-east New Guinea, New Britain (Lake Lalili), and northern and eastern Australia. Its habitat are large freshwater wetlands, swamps and lakes with abundant floating vegetation, such as water-lilies or water hyacinth, forming a mat on the water surface which it is able to walk on. Although the species is rare and localised it is not globally threatened.

Behaviour

General Behaviour 
The comb-crested jacana walks slowly and deliberately. It often congregates in flocks. When disturbed, it flies low over water and lands again on open vegetation.

Breeding
The comb-crested jacana is polyandrous.  It builds a flimsy nest on floating or emergent vegetation, in which the female lays four lustrous, pale brown eggs covered by black markings. Only males incubate. The young hatch well-developed and soon leave the nest.

Feeding
It eats seeds and aquatic insects gleaned from floating vegetation on the water surface.

Voice
This species gives a squeaky, high-pitched chittering, also described as a shrill trill with an explosive soft bugle.

References

 BirdLife International. (2006). Species factsheet: Irediparra gallinacea. Downloaded from https://web.archive.org/web/20130509230344/http://birdlife.org/ on 10 February 2007
 Marchant, S.; Higgins, P.J.; & Davies, J.N. (eds). (1994). Handbook of Australian, New Zealand and Antarctic Birds.  Volume 2: Raptors to Lapwings. Oxford University Press: Melbourne.  
 National Photographic Index of Australian Wildlife. (1987). The Shorebirds of Australia. Angus & Robertson: Sydney. 

comb-crested jacana
Birds of Australia
Birds of Indonesia
Birds of New Guinea
Birds of the Philippines
Birds of Borneo
Birds of the Lesser Sunda Islands
Birds of the Maluku Islands
Birds of New Britain
comb-crested jacana
Taxa named by Coenraad Jacob Temminck